Ü-Tsang (དབུས་གཙང་། Wylie; dbus gtsang) is one of the three Tibetan regions, the others being Amdo in the north-east, and Kham in the east. Ngari (including former Guge kingdom) in the north-west was incorporated into Ü-Tsang. Geographically Ü-Tsang covered the south-central of the Tibetan cultural area, including the Brahmaputra River watershed. The western districts surrounding and extending past Mount Kailash are included in Ngari, and much of the vast Changtang plateau to the north. The Himalayas defined Ü-Tsang's southern border. The present Tibet Autonomous Region corresponds approximately to what was ancient Ü-Tsang and western Kham.

Ü-Tsang was formed by the merging of two earlier power centers: Ü in central Tibet, controlled by the Gelug lineage of Tibetan Buddhism under the early Dalai Lamas, and Tsang which extended from Gyantse to points west, controlled by the rival Sakya lineage. Military victories by the powerful Khoshut Mongol Güshi Khan that backed 5th Dalai Lama and founded Ganden Phodrang government in 1642, consolidated power over the combined region, followed by the rule of the Qing Dynasty started in 1720 by the Qianlong Emperor that continued until the British expedition to Tibet (1903–1904).

Ü-Tsang is the cultural heartland of the Tibetan people, originally governed by Rinpungpa dynasty. The Tsangpa dynasty had ruled the Tsang part between 1565 and 1642. The dispute between Tsang kings, Karma Tenkyong Wangpo followers of karmapa and Khoshut khans, Güshi Khan, follower of gelugpa and Dalai Lamas ended by the  rule on Tibet from the Potala and Norbulingka palaces in Lhasa from the last one. Jokhang, perhaps the most holy temple in Tibetan Buddhism, is also located there. The Lhasa dialect is used as a lingua franca in Ü-Tsang and the Tibetan Exile koiné language is also based largely on it.

Front and Back Tibet
Tsang, whose largest cities are Gyantse and Shigatse, near where the Panchen Lama has his traditional seat at Tashilhunpo Monastery, was designated on maps of the Qing dynasty as "Back Tibet", while Ü, where the Dalai Lama has his seat at Lhasa, was designated "Front Tibet". This division was an artificial construct of the Chinese and had no currency within Tibet where the Dalai Lama exercised effective rule over both Tsang and Ü. An attempt had been made in the 18th century during the reign of the Yongzheng Emperor to split Tibet by offering the Panchen Lama dominion over Tsang, but the expansive offer was declined, the Panchen Lama only accepting a small portion of the offered territory. Later attempts, during the period 1906–1913 and in 1950, by the Panchen Lama to resurrect a separate Back Tibet over which he would have dominion were rejected by the Kashag.

References 

Administrative divisions of Tibet